Eddie the Eagle (born 1963) is a British ski jumper.

Eddie the Eagle or Eddie Eagle may also refer to:

People
 Ed Belfour (born 1965), Canadian ice hockey goalie nicknamed "Eddie the Eagle"

Mascots
 Eddie Eagle, the NRA's gun safety mascot
 Eddie the Eagle, the mascot of Colchester United F.C.

Films
 Eddie the Eagle (film), a 2016 biopic film about Eddie Edwards starring Taron Egerton

See also
 Eddie (disambiguation)
 Eagle (disambiguation)

 he was good